Cimahi Station (CMI) is a large class type C railway station located in Baros, Padalarang, Bandung Barat, to be precise on Station Street, Bandung Barat. The station, which is located at an altitude of +723 meters, is included in the Bandung Operational Area II.

Services
The following is a list of train services at the Cimahi Station.

Passenger services
 Executive class
 Mixed class
 Economy class

References

External links

Cimahi
Railway stations in West Java
Railway stations opened in 1884
Cultural Properties of Indonesia in West Java
Dutch colonial architecture in Indonesia